Electoral history of Bill Richardson, 30th Governor of New Mexico (2003–2011), 9th United States Secretary of Energy (1998–2001), 21st United States Ambassador to the United Nations (1997–1998), U.S. Representative from New Mexico's 1st district (1983–1997) and a candidate for the 2008 Democratic nomination for President of the United States

Congressional races (1980–1996)
New Mexico's 1st congressional district, 1980:
 Manuel Lujan, Jr. (R) (inc.) – 125,910 (51.01%)
 Bill Richardson – 120,903 (48.99%)

New Mexico's 3rd congressional district, 1982 (Democratic primary):
 Bill Richardson – 23,123 (36.22%)
 Roberto A. Mondragon – 19,691 (30.84%)
 George Perez – 12,412 (19.44%)
 Tom Udall – 8,619 (13.50%)

New Mexico's 3rd congressional district, 1982:
 Bill Richardson (D) – 84,669 (64.49%)
 Marjorie Bell Chambers (R) – 46,466 (35.39%)
 David A. Fernandez (I) – 158 (0.12%)

New Mexico's 3rd congressional district, 1984:
 Bill Richardson (D) (inc.) – 100,470 (60.81%)
 Louis H. Gallegos (R) – 62,351 (37.74%)
 Shirley Machocky Jones (LBT) – 2,388 (1.45%)

New Mexico's 3rd congressional district, 1986:
 Bill Richardson (D) (inc.) – 95,760 (71.30%)
 David F. Cargo (R) – 38,552 (28.70%)

New Mexico's 3rd congressional district, 1988:
 Bill Richardson (D) (inc.) – 124,938 (73.11%)
 Cecilia M. Salazar (R) – 45,954 (26.89%)

New Mexico's 3rd congressional district, 1990:
 Bill Richardson (D) (inc.) – 104,225 (74.46%)
 Phil T. Archuletta (R) – 35,751 (25.54%)

New Mexico's 3rd congressional district, 1992:
 Bill Richardson (D) (inc.) – 122,850 (67.42%)
 F. Gregg Bemis, Jr. (R) – 54,569 (29.95%)
 Ed Nagel (LBT) – 4,798 (2.63%)

New Mexico's 3rd congressional district, 1994:
 Bill Richardson (D) (inc,) – 99,900 (63.59%)
 F. Gregg Bemis, Jr. (R) – 53,515 (34.06%)
 Ed Nagel (LBT) – 3,697 (2.35%)

New Mexico's 3rd congressional district, 1996:
 Bill Richardson (D) (inc.) – 124,594 (67.25%)
 Bill Redmond (R) – 56,580 (30.54%)
 Ed Nagel (LBT) – 4,097 (2.21%)

Administration appointments (1996–2001)
United States Ambassador to the United Nations, 1997 (confirmation in the United States Senate):
 Yea – 100
 Nay – 0

United States Secretary of Energy, 1998 (confirmation in the United States Senate):
 Yea – 100
 Nay – 0

New Mexico gubernatorial races (2002–2006)
Democratic primary for Governor of New Mexico, 2002:
 Bill Richardson – 147,524 (99.80%)
 Mike Nalley (write-in) – 294 (0.20%)

New Mexico gubernatorial election, 2002:
 Bill Richardson/Diane Denish (D) – 268,693 (55.49%)
 John Sanchez/Rod Adair (R) – 189,074 (39.05%)
 David Bacon/Kathleen M. Sanchez (Green) – 26,466 (5.47%)

Democratic primary for Governor of New Mexico, 2006:
 Bill Richardson (inc.) – 107,720 (99.64%)
 Anselmo A. Chavez (write-in) – 388 (0.36%)

New Mexico gubernatorial election, 2006:
 Bill Richardson/Diane Denish (D) (inc.) – 384,806 (68.82%)
 John Dendahl/Sue Wilson Beffort (R) – 174,364 (31.18%)

United States presidential election, 2008
2008 New Hampshire Democratic vice presidential primary:
 Raymond Stebbins – 50,485 (46.93%)
 William Bryk – 22,965 (21.35%)
 John Edwards* – 10,553 (9.81%)
 Barack Obama* 6,402 (5.95%)
 Bill Richardson* (write-in) – 5,525 (5.14%)
 Hillary Clinton* (write-in) – 3,419 (3.18%)
 Joe Biden* – 1,512 (1.41%)
 Al Gore* – 966 (0.90%)
 Dennis Kucinich* – 762 (0.71%)
 Bill Clinton* – 388 (0.36%)
 John McCain* – 293 (0.27%)
 Christopher Dodd* – 224 (0.21%)
 Ron Paul* – 176 (0.16%)
 Jack Barnes, Jr.* – 95 (0.09%)
 Mike Gravel* – 91 (0.09%)
 Joe Lieberman* – 67 (0.06%)
 Mitt Romney* – 66 (0.06%)
 Mike Huckabee* – 63 (0.06%)
 Rudy Giuliani* – 46 (0.04%)
 Darrel Hunter* – 20 (0.02%)

(* – write-in)

2008 Democratic presidential primaries:

Excluding penalized contests, only primary and caucuses votes:

 Barack ObamaPN – 16,706,853
 Hillary Clinton – 16,239,821
 John Edwards* – 742,010
 Bill Richardson* – 89,054
 Uncommitted – 82,660
 Dennis Kucinich* – 68,482
 Joe Biden* – 64,041
 Mike Gravel* – 27,662
 Christopher Dodd* – 25,300
 Others – 22,556

Including penalized contests:

 Hillary Clinton – 18,225,175 (48.03%)
 Barack ObamaPN – 17,988,182 (47.41%)
 John Edwards* – 1,006,275 (2.65%)
 Uncommitted – 299,610 (0.79%)
 Bill Richardson* – 106,073 (0.28%)
 Dennis Kucinich* – 103,994 (0.27%)
 Joe Biden* – 81,641 (0.22%)
 Scattering – 44,348 (0.12%)
 Mike Gravel* – 40,251 (0.11%)
 Christopher Dodd* – 35,281 (0.09%)

(* – dropped out from race)(PN – presumptive nominee)

References

Richardson, Bill